Major-General John Martin Donald Ward-Harrison  (1918 – 26 March 1985) was a British Army officer.

Military career
Ward-Harrison was commissioned into the 5th Royal Inniskilling Dragoon Guards and saw action in North-West Europe during the Second World War. He became Deputy Commandant, Staff College, Camberley in 1966, General Officer Commanding, North East District in 1968 and Chief of Staff at Northern Command in 1970. He briefly returned to the command of North East District in January 1973 before retiring in July 1973.

He was appointed an Officer of the Order of the British Empire in the 1962 New Year Honours.

He married June Amoret Fleury Teulon; they had one daughter.

References

|-
 

1918 births
1985 deaths
British Army generals
Officers of the Order of the British Empire
Recipients of the Military Cross
5th Royal Inniskilling Dragoon Guards officers
British Army personnel of World War II
Academics of the Staff College, Camberley